Events from the year 1912 in Mexico.

Incumbents

Federal government
President: Francisco I. Madero
Vice President: José María Pino Suárez
Secretary of the Interior: Abraham González (governor) until February, Jesús Flores Magón until November, Rafael Hernandez

Governors
 Aguascalientes: Alberto Fuentes Dávila
 Campeche: Manuel Castilla Brito
 Chiapas: Reynaldo Gordillo León/Flavio Guillén
 Chihuahua: Aureliano L. González/Abraham González/Felipe R. Gutiérrez
 Coahuila: Venustiano Carranza
 Colima: José Trinidad Alamillo/Miguel García Topete
 Durango:  
 Guanajuato: 
 Hidalgo: 
 Jalisco: Alberto Robles Gil/José López Portillo y Rojas
 State of Mexico: 
 Michoacán: 
 Morelos: Ambrosio Figueroa/Francisco Naranjo/Aniceto Villamar Velázquez/Patricio Leyva Ochoa
 Nayarit: 
 Nuevo León: Viviano L. Villarreal
 Oaxaca: 
 Puebla: 
 Querétaro: 
 San Luis Potosí: Rafael Cepeda
 Sinaloa: 
 Sonora: José María Maytorena
 Tabasco: 
 Tamaulipas: 
 Tlaxcala:  
 Veracruz: Manuel María Alegre/Francisco Lagos Cházaro Mortero/Antonio Pérez Rivera
 Yucatán: 
 Zacatecas:

Events
March 24 – First Battle of Rellano
May 22 – Second Battle of Rellano

Births

Deaths
September 13 – Justo Sierra
November 10 – Ramon Corral

 
Years of the 20th century in Mexico
Mexico